This article lists the longest passenger rail services that are currently scheduled and running directly between two cities. Services that require railcar exchanges, coach changes, shunting or station transfers are not listed.

Longest train services, by distance

Longest non-stop train services, by distance and time 

This section lists the longest passenger rail services that are currently scheduled and running directly between two consecutive railway stations.

See also

 Longest train services
 List of countries by rail transport network size

References

External links
 Indian Railway Catering and Tourism Corporation, Official website
  Ministry of Indian Railways, Official website
  Indian Railways Live Information, Official website

Indian railway-related lists
Indian superlatives
Rail transport-related lists of superlatives